Georgetown High School may refer to:

 Georgetown High School (Delaware) in Georgetown, Delaware
 Georgetown High School (Louisiana) in Georgetown, Louisiana
 Georgetown High School (Massachusetts) in Georgetown, Massachusetts
 Georgetown Junior/Senior High School in Georgetown, Ohio
 Georgetown High School (South Carolina) in Georgetown, South Carolina
 Georgetown High School (Texas) in Georgetown, Texas
 Georgetown High School (Pietermaritzburg) in Pietermaritzburg, South Africa